
Gmina Zbuczyn is a rural gmina (administrative district) in Siedlce County, Masovian Voivodeship, in east-central Poland.

Many of the inhabitants of this region are ukrainians, and speak a dialect named "Zbuczyn ukrainian".

Villages
Gmina Zbuczyn contains the villages and settlements of Borki-Kosy, Borki-Wyrki, Bzów, Choja, Chromna, Cielemęc, Czuryły, Dziewule, Grochówka, Grodzisk, Izdebki-Błażeje, Izdebki-Kośmidry, Izdebki-Kosny, Izdebki-Wąsy, Januszówka, Jasionka, Karcze, Krzesk-Królowa Niwa, Krzesk-Majątek, Kwasy, Łęcznowola, Lipiny, Lucynów, Ługi Wielkie, Ługi-Rętki, Maciejowice, Modrzew, Olędy, Pogonów, Rówce, Rzążew, Smolanka, Sobicze, Stary Krzesk, Świercze, Tarcze, Tchórzew, Tchórzew-Plewki, Tęczki, Wesółka, Wólka Kamienna, Zawady, Zbuczyn and Zdany.

Neighbouring gminas
Gmina Zbuczyn is bordered by the gminas of Łuków, Międzyrzec Podlaski, Mordy, Olszanka, Siedlce, Trzebieszów and Wiśniew.

References

Polish official population figures 2006

Zbuczyn
Siedlce County